Izza may refer to:

 Darat Izza, a town in northern Syria
 Michael Izza, chief executive officer of the Institute of Chartered Accountants in England and Wales
 Jaysh al-Izza, Syrian rebel group
 Izza Génini (b. 1942), Moroccan film producer and director
 Izza Kizza, American hip-hop musician
 Izza Ignacio, actress in the Philippines

See also 
 Itza (disambiguation)